Sandro Schönberger (born January 14, 1987) is a German professional ice hockey player. He is currently playing for Straubing Tigers in the Deutsche Eishockey Liga (DEL).

References

External links

1987 births
Living people
German ice hockey left wingers
Straubing Tigers players
People from Weiden in der Oberpfalz
Sportspeople from the Upper Palatinate